= Kurt E. Armbruster =

American historian

Kurt Einar Armbruster is a historian and author in Seattle, Washington.

He graduated from the University of Washington. His book Before Seattle Rocked discusses Seattle's musical heritage.

A review in The Oregonian said: "Armbruster's book is packed with information on everything from the earliest pianos through the gold rush and Tin Pan Alley eras up through big band sounds and folk music," and that "He did a great job tracking down musicians from bygone days and gathering photos, including the smashing one of Guitar Shorty and his band on the cover."

His book Playing for Change is about the founders of the Seattle Repertory Playhouse, Burton and Florence James.

The history of American railroading is a lifelong interest, and he is currently (2023) managing editor of the Northern Pacific Railway Historical Association magazine, The Mainstreeter, for which he has written numerous articles. Armbruster is a musician and songwriter with two albums: Spookyjuice (2012) and One Good Ride (2019), under the name EINAR. He and his wife Cedar live in Seattle. He is a member of the Musicians' Union of Seattle Local 76-493.

== Bibliography ==
- Whistle Down the Valley: 100 Years of Green River Railroading (Northwest Railway and Locomotive Preservation Association, 1991) ISBN 9780962972539
- Orphan Road: The Railroad Comes to Seattle, 1853 - 1911. Washington State University Press, 1999. ISBN 9780874221862
- Before Seattle Rocked: A City and Its Music. University of Washington Press, 2011 ISBN 9780295991139
- Playing for Change : Burton and Florence James and the Seattle Repertory Playhouse. University Book Store Press, 2012.
- Pacific Coast, Seattle's Own Railroad. Pacific Northwest Railroad Archive, 2018 ISBN 9780692175439
- Cthulhu's Back In Town. AuthorHouse, 2022 ISBN 9781665552011
